Marigny-le-Lozon is a commune in the department of Manche, northwestern France. The municipality was established on 1 January 2016 by merger of the former communes of Marigny and Lozon.

Activities
The annual Duo Normand  cycling time trial starts and finishes from Marigny.

Sister cities 
Marigny-le-Lozon currently has one sister city:
  Westport, Connecticut, USA

See also 
Communes of the Manche department

References 

Communes of Manche
Populated places established in 2016
2016 establishments in France